Amity is an unincorporated community in Johnson County, Indiana, in the United States.

History
A post office was established at Amity in 1849, and remained in operation until it was discontinued in 1906. Amity was platted in 1855. Amity is derived from a French word meaning "friendship".

References

Unincorporated communities in Johnson County, Indiana
Unincorporated communities in Indiana